Cantagiro was an Italian summer song contest held from 1962 to 1972 and 1990 to 1993. It featured three categories, A for famous artists, B for newcomers and C for groups. The creator of the competition was Ezio Radaelli. The name of the festival was a reference to the bicycle race Giro d'Italia, and, as the Giro, Cantagiro was organized as a stage race consisting of eleven or twelve daily stages, each set in a different city. A peculiar characteristic of the festival was that, while traveling between one stage and the other, singers were required to travel in an open car, to be at the disposal of the crowd of fans, otherwise risking fines or disqualification from the competition; accordingly the travel usually resolved into a huge crowd, with fans waiting their idols in every corner of the path.

The festival was the main subject of two musicarello films, Urlo contro melodia nel Cantagiro 1963 (1964) and La più bella coppia del mondo (1967).

Winners

Cantagiro

Nuovo Cantagiro

Il Cantagiro - Edizione De Carlo

References 

Music festivals in Italy
1962 establishments in Italy